This is a list of villages in The Gambia. A village is a clustered human settlement or community, larger than a hamlet but smaller than a town or a city, with a population ranging from a few hundred to a few thousand.

A 

 Albreda
 Aljamdu
 Allunhari
 Allunhari Abdou
 Amdalai

Top of page

B 

 Badarri
 Baja Kunda
 Bakadaji
 Bakindick Mandinka
 Bambali
 Bani
 Banjulunding
 Banni
 Bantango Koto
 Bantanto
 Bantunding
 Banyakang
 Barajally
 Baro Kunda
 Barrow Kunda
 Barry Nabeh
 Basse Nding
 Batokunku
 Berefet
 Besang Dugu
 Bohum Kunda
 Boro Dampha Kunda
 Boro Kanda Kassy
 Boro Modi Bane
 Brifu
 Brikama Ba
 Brufut
 Bulok
 Busumbala
 Busura Alieu
 Bwiam

Top of page

C 

 Chamoi
 Chamoi Bunda

Top of page

D 

 Demba Kunda
 Diabugu
 Dumbutu
 Dobo
 Daru Rilwan

Top of page

E 

 Essau

Top of page

F 

 Faraba Banta
 Fatoto
 Fattatenda

Top of page

G 

 Gambissara
 Garowol
 Genieri
 Ghana Town

Top of page

J 

 Jufureh

Top of page

K 

 Kaiai
 Kalagi
 Kanilai
 Karantaba Tenda
 Kartung
 Kuntaur

Top of page

L 

 Lamin, North Bank Division
 Lamin, Western Division

Top of page

M–P 

 Mansa Konko
 Nema Kunku
 Pakali Ba

Top of page

S–Z 

 Sankandi
 Soma
 Suduwol
 Sukuta
 Sutukoba
 Tanji
 Yundum

Top of page

T. Tambasansang 

 Index of Gambia-related articles
 List of cities in The Gambia
 Outline of the Gambia

Populated places in the Gambia
Gambia geography-related lists